Ian Johns is an American professional poker player born in Seattle, Washington and now living in Rossmoor, California. He has won three bracelets at the World Series of Poker. He won his first bracelet in 2006 and won two bracelets in 2016.

Johns first cashed in the World Series of Poker in 2006 and won his first WSOP bracelet that year in the $3,000 Limit Hold'em event. He defeated a final table that included professional poker players Theo Tran and Mark Newhouse, earning $291,755 for his victory.

Ten years later, Johns won his second and third bracelets during the 2016 World Series of Poker. First he won the $1,500 HORSE tournament, earning his second bracelet and the cash prize of $212,604. He defeated well-known professional poker player and WSOP bracelet winner Justin Bonomo heads-up to win the event. Also at that final table were 1998 World Champion of Poker and five-time WSOP bracelet winner Scotty Nguyen, as well as Svetlana Gromenkova and Andre Akkari who are also bracelet winners. Less than two weeks later, Johns won his third bracelet in the $10,000 Limit Texas hold'em Championship tournament, earning an additional $290,635. At that final table were WSOP bracelet winners Brian Rast, Brock Parker, Bill Chen, and David Chiu.

As of 2017, Johns' live poker tournament earnings exceed $1,400,000. His 29 cashes at the World Series of Poker make up over $1,195,000 of his total earnings.

World Series of Poker bracelets

References

American poker players
World Series of Poker bracelet winners
Sportspeople from Seattle
Living people
Year of birth missing (living people)